Ramakrishnan is an Indian actor who has appeared in Tamil language films. Since his debut in Rajmohan's rural drama Kunguma Poovum Konjum Puravum (2009), he has worked in leading and supporting roles in films including Pongadi Neengalum Unga Kadhalum (2014) and Oru Kanavu Pola (2017).

Career
Ramakrishnan started out as an assistant to director K. Balachander and later worked with director Cheran, with the aim of becoming a director. He later changed his mind when S. P. B. Charan asked him to play the lead in the rural drama Kunguma Poovum Konjum Puravum (2009) directed by Rajmohan. He worked on the film instead of acting in Pandiraj's Pasanga (2009). He later followed it up with Goripalayam (2010) directed by Rasu Madhuravan and the long-delayed Vetkathai Kettal Enna Tharuvaai, where he was supposed to portray lead actor but was replaced by Ashok and ended up portraying a guest appearance. Ramakrishnan also agreed to direct a script for Charan's production house but the film eventually did not materialise.

In 2014, he directed and starred in Pongadi Neengalum Unga Kadhalum (2014), which was widely criticised by reviewers for its sexist theme. In 2017, he appeared in Yentha Nerathilum and Oru Kanavu Pola.

Filmography

Television

References

Living people
Male actors from Tamil Nadu
Indian male film actors
Male actors in Tamil cinema
People from Ramanathapuram district
1982 births